
Sepulveda or Sepúlveda may refer to:

Places

California 
 Sepulveda Boulevard, a major street in Los Angeles
 Sepulveda Dam, a flood control dam in the San Fernando Valley which regulates the Sepulveda Basin
 Sepulveda Pass, a pass over the Santa Monica Mountains connecting the Los Angeles Basin and the San Fernando Valley
 Sepulveda, California, now called North Hills, a neighborhood within Los Angeles.

Other 
 Sepúlveda, Segovia, a municipality in the province of Segovia, Castile and León, Spain

People

California
Sepúlveda family of California
Francisco Xavier Sepúlveda (1742–1788), founder of the family
Juan Jose Sepúlveda (1764–1808), member of the Ávila family of California
Francisco Sepúlveda II (1775–1853), member of the Ávila family of California
Juan María Sepúlveda (19th century), noted ranchero
Juan Capistrano Sepúlveda (19th century), politician

Elsewhere
Daniel Sepulveda, former American football punter
Eduardo Sepúlveda, Argentine track and road cyclist
Juan Ginés de Sepúlveda, Spanish theologian and author of the 16th century who wrote in Latin
Lorenzo de Sepúlveda, 16th-century Spanish author of romances in verse
Luis Sepúlveda (1949–2020), Chilean writer
Luis Fernando Sepúlveda, Chilean track and road cyclist 
Luis R. Sepúlveda, American politician
María Luisa Sepúlveda, Chilean composer
Sandra Sepúlveda, Colombian footballer

Spanish-language surnames